Robert Louis Ginepri (born October 7, 1982) is a retired American professional tennis player. He won three ATP singles titles in his career and achieved a career-high ranking of World No. 15 in December 2005. Ginepri's best Grand Slam result was the semifinals of the 2005 US Open, where he lost to Andre Agassi.

Early life
Robby Ginepri is of  Luxembourgish ancestry.
He attended Joseph Wheeler High School, located in Marietta, Georgia. He graduated as a member of the class of 2001.

Career

2005
Ginepri was the first player to be beaten by Novak Djokovic in the main draw of a Grand Slam tournament, at the 2005 French Open.

In August, he reached the semifinals of an ATP Masters Series tournament for the first time in his career, in Cincinnati, Ohio. He beat 2005 French Open runner-up Mariano Puerta in the first round, David Ferrer in the second round, 1998 French Open champion Carlos Moyá in the third round, and two-time Grand Slam singles titlist Marat Safin in the quarterfinals. He then lost to world no. 1 Roger Federer in the semifinals.

His summer hardcourt record was 14–3 when he arrived two weeks later at the US Open as an unseeded player. After defeating Guillermo Garcia-Lopez in the first round, and Andy Roddick's conqueror, Gilles Müller, in the second round, both in straight sets, Ginepri then put together three consecutive five-set wins, defeating Tommy Haas in the third round, Richard Gasquet in the fourth round, and Guillermo Coria in the quarterfinals. He then lost to Andre Agassi in the semifinals in five sets. Ginepri thus became the first player in the open era to play four consecutive five-set matches at the US Open.

In November at the Madrid Masters, Ginepri made it to another ATP Masters Series semifinal, before losing to eventual champion Rafael Nadal. He also won the inaugural Superset Tennis tournament, a groundbreaking one-set, one-day tournament, earning him prize money of $250,000. He finished 2005 at world no. 15 in the ATP rankings, the highest ranking of his career.

2006–2007
Ginepri's results in 2006 did not match his successes in 2005. He lost in the second round of the Australian Open and the first round of both the French Open and Wimbledon. At the US Open, he lost in the third round to German Tommy Haas in a fifth-set tiebreaker. He finished the year ranked world no. 51 with a 24–26 record. Ginepri lost in the third round of both the Australian Open and the US Open and the first round of both the French Open and Wimbledon. He finished the year ranked world no. 134.

2008
At the tournament in Delray Beach, Florida, Ginepri lost in the semifinals to James Blake. In his next tournament, the SAP Open in San Jose, California, Ginepri was able to defeat Blake in the quarterfinals, but lost in the semifinals to Radek Štěpánek.

At the Tennis Channel Open in Las Vegas, Nevada, Ginepri reached the semifinals for his third consecutive tournament. Ginepri defeated Xavier Malisse in the first round, world no. 17 Marcos Baghdatis in the second round, and Ernests Gulbis in the quarterfinals, before falling to Kevin Anderson. Ginepri then played the Tennis Masters Series Pacific Life Open in Indian Wells, California, losing in the second round to Carlos Moyá.

At the Hypo Group Tennis International in Pörtschach, Austria, Ginepri lost in the quarterfinals to Juan Mónaco. He then made it to the fourth round of the French Open, before losing to 24th-seeded Fernando González. On grass, Ginepri lost in the second round of The Artois Championships in London to Andy Roddick and the first round of Wimbledon to Gonzalez.

On June 23, 2008, Ginepri's ranking was world no. 59, a rise of 112 places since January 28, 2008. Ginepri then made his Olympic debut tennis at the 2008 Olympic Games in Beijing, China, losing in the first round. In July, Ginepri made his debut in the World Team Tennis league, playing for the new Washington Kastles team.

At the 2009 US Open, Ginepri advanced to the second round, before losing to Nicolás Almagro in five sets.

2010
Ginepri lost in the first round of the Australian Open. He beat Sam Querrey in four sets in the first round of the French Open and Potito Starace in the second round. He beat no. 16 Juan Carlos Ferrero in five sets, advancing to play in the fourth round, where he lost against Novak Djokovic in four sets. He was the only unseeded player left in the competition, along with qualifier Gabashvili, and the last American in the men's field.

He lost to Robin Söderling in straight sets in the first round of Wimbledon.

In October, Ginepri was involved in a biking accident causing him to have surgery on his arm. He didn't return to the pro tour until July 2011.

2011–2014
Ginepri participated in the Atlanta Tennis Championships as a wildcard. His first match was against fellow wildcard Tommy Haas. He received a wildcard to the US Open, where he defeated Brazilian João Souza in the first round in a four-set match. He then lost to John Isner in the second round.

In the early part of 2013, Ginepri won a Futures event and made the final of a Challenger tournament. Ginepri made it to the quarterfinals of the US Clay Court Championship in Houston before losing to Juan Mónaco. He failed to qualify for the French Open and did not participate in Wimbledon. In 2014, having competed in futures tournaments throughout the start of the season, Ginepri participated in his first Challenger at the 2014 Sarasota Open, retiring after one match in the first round of qualifying. After winning the USTA wildcard position for the 2014 French Open, he lost to Rafael Nadal in the first round, 6–0, 6–3, 6–0.

Personal life

Ginepri was born in Fort Lauderdale, Florida and graduated from Joseph Wheeler High School in Marietta, Georgia. Ginepri currently lives in Acworth, Georgia. He owns the Olde Town Athletic Club in Marietta. His father, Rene, who is originally from Luxembourg, is a systems analyst and his mother, Nancy, is a second grade teacher.

Ginepri retired from the tour in 2015. He was briefly linked with actress Minnie Driver. Married Josephine Stafford on September 29, 2012 in Atlanta, Georgia. On February 22, 2007, Ginepri participated on Spike TV's Pros vs. Joes with Rik Smits, Rob Dibble, and Andre Rison.

Junior Grand Slam finals

Singles: 1 (1 runner-up)

Doubles: 1 (1 runner-up)

ATP career finals

Singles: 3 (3 titles)

Doubles: 1 (1 runner-up)

ATP Challenger and ITF Futures Finals

Singles: 12 (7–5)

Doubles: 1 (0–1)

Performance timelines

Singles

Doubles

Top 10 wins

References

External links

 Official site
 
 
 

1982 births
Living people
American male tennis players
American people of Luxembourgian descent
Olympic tennis players of the United States
Sportspeople from Fort Lauderdale, Florida
Sportspeople from Marietta, Georgia
Tennis people from Florida
Tennis people from Georgia (U.S. state)
Tennis players at the 2008 Summer Olympics